Mahrt is an locale in Russell County in the U.S. state of Alabama, with a paper mill and a rail terminus. Mahrt is located along the Chattahoochee River. It is 40 river miles south of Columbus, Georgia and on the other side of the river in Alabama.

The mill had various owners including MeadWestvaco (which became part of WestRock). Al H. Mart was a founder of Georgia Kraft Company. The area was named for the Mead executive.

See also
Cottonton, Alabama

References

Populated places in Alabama